Mario Liverani (born 10 January 1939 in Rome), is an Italian historian and Professor of Ancient Near East History at the University of Rome La Sapienza. He is a member of many institutions, such as the American Oriental Society, Accademia delle Scienze di Torino, and doctor Honoris Causa of the University of Copenhagen and the Autonomous University of Madrid.

Awards and honors
2014 Sheikh Zayed Book Award in the "Arabic Culture in Other Languages" category for his book "Imagining Babylon"

Selected works
International Relations in the Ancient Near East, 1600-1100 BC. Studies in Diplomacy. New York: Palgrave, 2001.
Myth and Politics in Ancient Near Eastern Historiography. Written in co-operation with Zainab Bahrani. Studies in Egyptology and the Ancient Near East. London: Equinox, 2004.
Israel's History And the History of Israel. Translated by Chiara Peri and Philip R. Davies. Bible World. London: Equinox, 2005.
Antico Oriente: Storia, Società, Economia. Biblioteca Storica Laterza. Rome: Laterza, 2011.

 Imagining Babylon: The Modern Story of an Ancient City (Studies in Ancient Near Eastern Records (SANER) Book 11),

References

External links 
 Faculty of Humanities at the University of Rome La Sapienza

1939 births
Living people
Academic staff of the Sapienza University of Rome

Italian orientalists